Marion Charles Matthes (January 29, 1906 – November 30, 1980) was a United States circuit judge of the United States Court of Appeals for the Eighth Circuit.

Education and career

Born in De Soto, Missouri, Matthes attended Benton College of Law (now defunct), and read law in 1928 to enter the bar. He was in private practice in DeSoto and Hillsboro, Missouri from 1928 to 1955. He was deputy state finance commissioner in 1929, and was a city attorney for DeSoto from 1938 to 1940. In 1942, he was elected to the Missouri Senate, where he served until 1950. He was a member of the Missouri State Highway Commission from 1954 to 1955. Matthes also lectured at the School of Law at Washington University in St. Louis.

Federal judicial service

On February 19, 1958, Matthes was nominated by President Dwight D. Eisenhower to a seat on the United States Court of Appeals for the Eighth Circuit vacated by Judge Charles Evans Whittaker. Matthes was confirmed by the United States Senate on March 4, 1958, and received his commission on March 12, 1958. He served as Chief Judge from 1970 to 1973, assuming senior status on July 14, 1973, and serving in that capacity until his death on November 30, 1980.

References

Sources
 

1906 births
1980 deaths
Judges of the United States Court of Appeals for the Eighth Circuit
United States court of appeals judges appointed by Dwight D. Eisenhower
20th-century American judges
United States federal judges admitted to the practice of law by reading law
People from De Soto, Missouri
People from Hillsboro, Missouri
Washington University in St. Louis faculty